John Jerome Cunneen (5 May 1932 – 9 November 2010) was a New Zealand prelate who served as the eighth Catholic Bishop of Christchurch from 1995 until 2007. He was succeeded as bishop by Barry Jones.

Death
Cunneen died on 9 November 2010 at the age of 78. He was laid in state at St Mary's pro-Cathedral in Christchurch  but was buried in The Cathedral of the Blessed Sacrament.

Notes

External links
 Catholic Hierarchy website, "Bishop John Cunneen (bishop)|John Cunneen" (retrieved 28 January 2011).

1932 births
2010 deaths
Holy Name Seminary alumni
Holy Cross College, New Zealand alumni
20th-century Roman Catholic bishops in New Zealand
Roman Catholic bishops of Christchurch
People from Ashburton, New Zealand